Matt McManamon is a Liverpool-born singer-songwriter and guitarist most known for his role as lead singer for The Dead 60s. McManamon has also played lead guitar for The Specials, and has toured and recorded with several other artists including The BibleCode Sundays.

He recorded and released his first solo album, 'Scally Folk' to critical acclaim on 28th May 2021 via independent London based boutique record label ‘Fretsore Records’.

Discography

Studio albums
 2021 – Scally Folk (Fretsore Records)

Singles
 2019 - “Seas Of Gold” (Late Developer Recordings)
 2019 - “Sinking Sands” (Late Developer Recordings)
 2020 - “Goodbye” (Fretsore Records)
 2020 - “Pulling At The Reins” (Fretsore Records)
 2021 - “Jumpin’ The Gun” (Fretsore Records)
 2021 - “Every Time I Close My Eyes” (Fretsore Records)
 2021 - “Mulranny Smile” (Fretsore Records)
 2022 - “Out Of The Cold” (Fretsore Records)
 2022 - “Step Into My Heart” (Fretsore Records)

References

Living people
Year of birth missing (living people)
Place of birth missing (living people)
Musicians from Liverpool
The Specials members
British ska musicians
21st-century English singers